This is a list of former members of the National Collegiate Athletic Association (NCAA) Division I Southern Conference (SoCon). Most former members are currently members of either the Southeastern Conference or the Atlantic Coast Conference.

Two of the former full members, Appalachian State and Davidson, maintain SoCon associate membership in wrestling. A third former full member, Georgia Southern, became an associate member in rifle when the SoCon added the sport for the 2016–17 school year.

See also
List of Southern Conference football champions
List of Southern Conference men's basketball champions
Southern Conference baseball tournament

Southern Conference